In organic chemistry, an allyl group is a substituent with the structural formula . It consists of a methylene bridge attached to a vinyl group. The name is derived from the scientific name for garlic, . In 1844, Theodor Wertheim isolated an allyl derivative from garlic oil and named it "".

Allylation is any chemical reaction that adds an allyl group to a substrate.

Nomenclature

A site adjacent to the unsaturated carbon atom is called the allylic position or allylic site.  A group attached at this site is sometimes described as allylic. Thus,  "has an allylic hydroxyl group".  Allylic C−H bonds are about 15% weaker than the C−H bonds in ordinary sp3 carbon centers and are thus more reactive. 

Benzylic and allylic are related in terms of structure, bond strength, and reactivity. Other reactions that tend to occur with allylic compounds are allylic oxidations, ene reactions, and the Tsuji–Trost reaction.  Benzylic groups are related to allyl groups; both show enhanced reactivity.

Pentadienyl group

A  group connected to two vinyl groups is said to be doubly allylic. The bond dissociation energy of C−H bonds on a doubly allylic centre is about 10% less than the bond dissociation energy of a C−H bond that is allylic.  The weakened C−H bonds reflect the high stability of the resulting pentadienyl radicals. Compounds containing the  linkages, e.g. linoleic acid derivatives, are prone to autoxidation, which can lead to polymerization or form semisolids. This reactivity pattern is fundamental to the film-forming behavior of the "drying oils", which are components of oil paints and varnishes.

Homoallylic
The term homoallylic refers to the position on a carbon skeleton next to an allylic position.  In but-3-enyl chloride , the chloride is homoallylic because it is bonded to the homoallylic site.

Bonding
The allyl group is widely encountered in organic chemistry. Allylic radicals, anions, and cations are often discussed as intermediates in reactions.  All feature three contiguous sp²-hybridized carbon centers and all derive stability from resonance. Each species can be presented by two resonance structures with the charge or unpaired electron distributed at both 1,3 positions.

In terms of MO theory, the MO diagram has three molecular orbitals: the first one bonding, the second one non-bonding, and the higher energy orbital is antibonding.

Reactions and applications
This heightened reactivity of allylic groups has many practical consequences. The sulfur vulcanization or various rubbers exploits the conversion of allylic  groups into  crosslinks.  Similarly drying oils such as linseed oil crosslink via oxygenation of allylic (or doubly allylic) sites.  This crosslinking underpins the properties of paints and the spoilage of foods by rancidification.

The industrial production of acrylonitrile by ammoxidation of propene exploits the easy oxidation of the allylic C−H centers:
2CH3-CH=CH2 + 2 NH3 + 3 O2 -> 2CH2=CH-C#N + 6 H2O

An estimated 800,000 tonnes (1997) of allyl chloride is produced by the chlorination of propylene:
CH3CH=CH2 + Cl2  -> ClCH2CH=CH2 + HCl
It is the precursor to allyl alcohol and epichlorohydrin.

Allylation
Allylation is the attachment of an allyl group to a substrate, usually another organic compound.  Classically, allylation involves the reaction of a carbanion with allyl chloride.  Another well-developed process involves addition of allyltrimethylsilane to carbonyls, i.e. carbonyl allylation.
Allylation can be effected also by conjugate addition: the addition of an allyl group to the beta-position of an enone. The Hosomi-Sakurai reaction is a common method for conjugate allylation.

Allyl compounds
Many substituents can be attached to the allyl group to give stable compounds. Commercially important allyl compounds include:
Crotyl alcohol (CH3CH=CH−CH2OH)
Dimethylallyl pyrophosphate, central in the biosynthesis of terpenes, a precursor to many natural products, including natural rubber.
Transition-metal allyl complexes, such as allylpalladium chloride dimer

See also

 Allylic strain
 Carroll rearrangement
 Allylic palladium complex
 Tsuji–Trost reaction
 Propargylic/Homopropargylic
 Benzylic
 Vinylic
 Acetylenic
 Naloxone
 Allylic rearrangement

References

Alkenyl groups
Allyl compounds